The First Congregational Church at 1887 E. Cecil St. in Waynoka, Oklahoma was listed on the National Register of Historic Places in 2017.

It was deemed "significant as an excellent local example of the late 19th- and 20th-century Revival style. The church building is a subtle combination of the Mission and Late Gothic Revival styles."

References

National Register of Historic Places in Woods County, Oklahoma
Mission Revival architecture in Oklahoma
Gothic Revival architecture in Oklahoma
Churches completed in 1920
Churches on the National Register of Historic Places in Oklahoma